Bryan Keane (born 20 August 1980) is an Irish triathlete who won a team bronze medal at the 2000 European Cross Country Championships. He placed 7th at the 2010 ITU Sprint Distance Triathlon World Championships and 40th at the 2016 Olympics.

References

Living people
Irish male triathletes
1980 births
Place of birth missing (living people)
Triathletes at the 2016 Summer Olympics
Olympic triathletes of Ireland